Brittany Marlowe Holberg (born January 1, 1973) is a woman currently on death row in the U.S. state of Texas. On Friday, March 27, 1998, Holberg was convicted of the November 13, 1996, robbery and murder of 80-year-old A. B. Towery Sr. (1916–1996) in his southwest Amarillo home, and was sentenced to death by 251st state District Judge Patrick Pirtle. The victim had been stabbed nearly 60 times with such weapons as a paring knife, a butcher knife, a grapefruit knife and a fork. He also suffered blunt trauma to the head from a hammer, and a foot-long lamp pole had been shoved more than five inches (127 mm) down his throat.

Murder trial

After a knee injury Holberg became addicted to painkillers. This led to the use of street drugs, a habit she supported with prostitution. Holberg claims she was introduced to Towery by a fellow prostitute named "Green Eyes", but investigators were not able to verify her claim. During the trial, Defense Attorney Catherine Brown Dodson argued that Towery was wrongly portrayed as an innocent elderly man, and that Holberg acted in self defense when Towery attacked her. Dodson said A.B. Towery became angry and violent when he found a crack pipe on Holberg. She told the jury that Towery struck Holberg twice in the head with a metal pan while her back was turned, and then threatened her with a knife. Holberg reacted by stabbing him with her own knife, and the fight escalated until Holberg put the lamp post in his mouth to attempt to end the struggle. Holberg believed she would have little legal recourse, because of her status as a drug-abusing prostitute, and fled to Tennessee. Despite her self defense claim, after the murder she showered, then exchanged her bloody clothes for some of his clean clothes. She also robbed him of $1400 that was in his wallet.

Holberg filed an appeal in the Court of Criminal Appeals of Texas (no. 73,127), but on November 29, 2000, the appeals court upheld the decision of the trial court.

In 2015, James Farren, the district attorney of Randall County, stated that due to the legal complications involving the Holberg case and the resulting legal expenses—he estimated the cost was about $400,000—and time expended, he would pursue life imprisonment without parole for future capital murder cases unless exceptional circumstances occur.

Personal life
Holberg had spoken out about the death penalty, has talked of abuse in the Texas criminal-justice system, and has called for better conditions for prisoners. In a 2001 letter written to the Canadian Coalition Against the Death Penalty, Holberg said,

Just two weeks ago, we were informed that not only would we be strip-searched for our one hour of recreation a day, but also when taken for a shower. So for the last two weeks, we have been stripped no less than six times a day, and our cells have been completely ransacked. This is every day, sometimes at times like 2:30 and 3 am, and we never leave the building - or our cells for that matter.

She has also written on behalf of other prisoners, such as a 62-year-old murderer named Betty Lou Beets.

In 2003, Holberg was interviewed by Ms. magazine about her life. She had married as a teenager and in 1993 gave birth to a daughter. At the age of 20, Holberg moved back to Amarillo, her hometown, and subsequently fell in with a bad crowd. In a Dallas Morning News account, Holberg was described as a woman who was exposed to drugs at home when she was 13 or 14 years old, and had married before she completed high school. After the dissolution of her marriage, she became addicted to drugs and confessed to scamming prescription medication from dentists with her aunt. Holberg was caught with drugs and was released from state custody after completion of a substance-abuse felony punishment program on September 1, 1996. Holberg had also once been gang raped, severely beaten, and cut with a knife; she was hospitalized after the incident.

Holberg's most recent media mention was in a January 2007 Maxim magazine article titled "Babes Behaving Badly", which featured 10 women convicted of crimes. Holberg is one of only six women currently sentenced to death in Texas.

See also

 List of death row inmates in the United States
 List of women on death row in the United States

References

1973 births
1996 murders in the United States
People from Amarillo, Texas
Living people
American people convicted of murder
American female murderers
American prisoners sentenced to death
Prisoners sentenced to death by Texas
People convicted of murder by Texas
Women sentenced to death
American prostitutes